Sahra is a studio album from Algerian raï artist Khaled, released in 1996. It was the artist's biggest production to date, being co-produced by Philippe Eidel, Don Was, Jean-Jacques Goldman and Clive Hunt, and including performances by many other singers from around the world. It features what is perhaps Khaled's most popular song, "Aïcha". Most tracks are sung in Arabic, with a notable dosage of French. "Ki Kounti" is partially sung in Spanish as it features Mexican Rock vocalist Saúl Hernández from the band Caifanes. The title track is named after Khaled's first daughter, Sarah, to whom the album is dedicated along with her mother, Samira.

The album was certified platinum by Syndicat National de l'Édition Phonographique on October 15, 1997.

The album was re-released by Wrasse Records in the US & UK in 2005.

Track listing
Credits adapted from.

References

Khaled (musician) albums
1996 albums
Albums produced by Don Was
Mango Records albums
Albums produced by Philippe Eidel